Calyptrocalyx elegans is a palm species in the genus Calyptrocalyx found in Papua New Guinea and the nearby Maluku Islands.

References

External links
 Calyptrocalyx elegans at Tropicos

elegans
Flora of Papua New Guinea
Flora of the Maluku Islands
Plants described in 1889
Taxa named by Odoardo Beccari